This article contains an overview of the year 1995 in athletics.

Major Events

World

Grand Prix Final
World Championships
World Cross Country Championships
World Half Marathon Championships
World Indoor Championships
World Race Walking Cup

Regional

All-Africa Games
Asian Championships
CARIFTA Games
Central American and Caribbean Championships
European Cross Country Championships
European Junior Championships
Pan American Games
Pan American Junior Championships
South American Championships
South American Junior Championships

World records

Men

Women

Awards

Men

Women

Season's bests

References

1995 in athletics (track and field)
Athletics (track and field) by year